Commonly prescribed drugs are drugs that are frequently provided by doctors in a prescription to treat a certain disease. These drugs are often first-line treatment for the target diseases and are effective in tackling the symptoms. An example of the target disease is ischemic heart disease. Some examples of commonly prescribed drugs for this disease are beta-blockers, calcium-channel blockers and nitrates.

In accordance with the pharmacological effects, commonly prescribed drugs can be divided into different groups. Drugs in the same group exert nearly identical effects, and can be utilized for treating the prevailing disease and sometimes, preventing complications of the existing diseases.

The use of commonly prescribed drugs can be reflected from the number of prescriptions of the drugs. Countries have their own dataset in recording the trend of commonly prescribed drugs. For example, the United States uses the Medical Expenditure Panel Survey (MEPS) and England uses the English Prescribing Dataset to record the prescription data for showing which drugs are commonly prescribed.

Understanding commonly prescribed drugs allows healthcare professionals to react to symptoms quickly and new treatment strategies can be developed. However, the data for commonly prescribed drugs may be outdated due to the time lag between data collection and publication as well as errors in data collection process.

History 
Commonly prescribed drugs are prescribed according to guidelines around the world. For instance, for ischemic heart disease, the American College of Cardiology/American Heart Association (ACC/AHA) guideline is used in the United States and the European Society of Cardiology (ESC) guideline is used in Europe. Western guidelines are more commonly used for reference during the development of local practice guidelines due to the large number of western guidelines stored in guideline databases. The data of prescriptions are collected through the government, such as Medical Expenditure Panel Survey (MEPS) in America and the Pharmaceutical Benefit Scheme (PBS) in Australia, providing information on the actual prescription volume of drugs.

The United States 
The Medical Expenditure Panel Survey (MEPS) conducted by the Agency for Healthcare Research and Quality (AHRQ) via the United States government is used to collect prescription data and data for other healthcare services, including home healthcare, children's health and preventive care in America. The survey started in 1996 and was the predecessor of the National Medical Expenditure Survey (NMES) and the National Medical Care Utilization and Expenditure Survey (NMCUES), which were conducted in 1977 (NMES-1), 1980 (NMCUES), and 1987 (NMES-2). The survey is updated every year with the renewed data from the country. The prescription data is published in the Prescribed Medicines File of the MEPS. The collection of data involves two components: Household component and the Medical Provider component. The household component collects self-reported data of the prescribed medicines and the demographic information of the respondents. The Medical Provider component acts as a piece of follow-back information provided by the pharmacy including a computerized printout for all prescription filled for the patient.

The United Kingdom 
The English Prescribing Dataset (EPD) from the NHS Business Services Authority (NHSBSA) provides prescription data in the United Kingdom. The dataset was created in 2014. EPD is a combination of the Detailed Prescribing Information (DPI) and the Practice Level Prescribing in England (PLP). Both DPI and PLP are previous datasets from NHSBSA and NHS Digital respectively and EPD aims to replace them both in the future, but no specific date of replacement is given. EPD collects data from England, Wales, Scotland, Guernsey, Alderney, Jersey and the Isle of Man. EPD provides the item, quantity, net ingredient cost, actual cost, average daily quantity (ADQ), practice name and address details of the prescription.

Australia 
The Pharmaceutical Benefits Scheme (PBS) from the Australian Government Department of Health provides the prescription data of prescriptions under PBS. PBS started in 1948 and the under co-payment prescriptions were added into the dataset from 1 April 2012. It publishes the PBS expenditure and prescriptions report every year recording prescription data in the past 12 months. The examples of data it provides are the top 50 drugs by total prescription volume and the top 50 drugs by government cost.

Benefits and limitations

Benefits 
Understanding commonly prescribed drugs for different diseases can allow healthcare professionals to be more confident and decisive when choosing the most suitable treatment for the patient. This can also help develop new treatment strategies by researchers for more effective treatments. By enriching the knowledge of commonly prescribed drugs, pharmacy students will be more familiar with their mechanism of action, first-line therapy indications and side effects.

Limitations 
Limitations include time lag for the conducted survey. The Medical Expenditure Panel Survey (MEPS) shows data recorded two years before the publishing of the survey. The time lag may lead to a difference in representing the current prescribing practice with the recorded data in the survey. Questionnaires which are self-reported tend to create recall bias. Respondents are likely to underreport the number of prescription drugs they have as those drugs are usually for short-term use and intermittent use, such as analgesics and topical agents.

Examples of commonly prescribed drugs 
Two diseases from the top 10 causes of death introduced by the World Health Organization (WHO) in 2019 are used as examples, namely ischemic heart disease (ranked 1st) from cardiovascular diseases and Chronic Obstructive Pulmonary Disease from respiratory diseases (ranked 3rd). Although stroke is ranked 2nd by WHO, drugs used are similar to ischemic heart disease. Moreover, surgical interventions are commonly required, so it will be out of the scope of this article and it will not be introduced.

Ischemic Heart Disease   

Ischemic Heart Disease (IHD) or coronary heart disease is the lack of supply of blood to an area in the heart, often due to plaque formation (atherosclerosis), causing inadequacy of oxygen to heart muscle and eventually leading to myocardial infarction. This disease can be classified into acute and chronic coronary heart disease. This disease caused 8.9 million deaths in 2019 and was ranked 1st in the top 10 causes of death globally by the World Health Organization (WHO).

The treatment of Ischemic Heart Disease can be divided into two directions: risk factor control and symptomatic relief.

Commonly prescribed drugs for Ischemic Heart Disease

Chronic Obstructive Pulmonary Disease (COPD) 
Chronic Obstructive Pulmonary Disease (COPD) is a disease that causes chronic respiratory problems by gradually blocking the respiratory tracts. The continuous exposure to toxic fumes produced by cigarettes, vehicle engines and other human activities leads to inflammation of the respiratory tract, causing the development of COPD. The problem will deteriorate over time if it is not well managed. It will eventually cause respiratory failure and death in the late stage. It is the third deadliest disease reported by WHO in 2019 and it accounted for 6% of total deaths.

There are two types of management plan in COPD, namely regular treatment and acute exacerbation. In acute exacerbation, new medications will be added to the existing prescription and they will be stopped once the exacerbation is managed.

Combination inhalers 

In patients with COPD, multiple inhalers need to be used at a time. There are two major types of inhaler, namely dry-powder inhaler(DPI) and metered-dose inhaler(MDI), and many more subtypes with different techniques for using them. Adherence is also an issue with the use of multiple inhalers. Generally with different types of inhalers, the adherence will be lowered. Proper inhaler technique and adherence are two of the factors that affect the management of COPD. Other factors include smoking cessation and participation in physical activities, to name but a few. With inappropriately applied inhaler technique and low adherence, there will be ineffective management of COPD, thus increasing in the burden on the healthcare sector. As a result, inhalers combining multiple medications are invented to tackle the problem.

References 

Drugs